The High Commissioner of the United Kingdom to Zambia is the United Kingdom's foremost diplomatic representative in the Republic of Zambia, and head of the UK's diplomatic mission in Lusaka.

As fellow members of the Commonwealth of Nations, the United Kingdom and Zambia conduct their diplomatic relations at governmental level, rather than between heads of state. Therefore, the countries exchange high commissioners, rather than ambassadors.

High Commissioners to Zambia

1964–1966: Sir Leslie Monson
1967–1971: Sir Laurence Pumphrey
1971–1974: John Duncan
1974–1978: Stephen Miles
1978–1980: Sir Leonard Allinson
1980–1984: Sir John Johnson
1984–1987: William White
1988–1990: John Willson
1990–1993: Peter Hinchcliffe
1993–1997: Patrick Nixon
1997–2001: Thomas Young
2001–2005: Timothy David
2005–2008: Alistair Harrison
2008–2011: Thomas Carter and Carolyn Davidson
2012–2015: James Thornton
2015–2016: Lucy Joyce (acting)

2016–2019: Fergus Cochrane-Dyet
2019 Nicholas Wooley

External links

UK and Zambia, gov.uk

References

Zambia
 
United Kingdom and the Commonwealth of Nations
Zambia and the Commonwealth of Nations
United Kingdom